Nicolai Leontievich Volodos (Nikolay, Nikolai, Nicholas); (15 May 1934 - 3 April 2016) was a Soviet and Ukrainian cardiovascular surgeon and scientist. An innovator, Volodos developed and introduced into clinical practice the world's first endovascular stent graft for the treatment of stenotic and aneurysmal diseases of arterial system. Volodos was described by his colleagues as ”a pioneer innovator and a giant in vascular and endovascular surgery” and ”a giant of historic proportions in the vascular and endovascular specialties, and the father of endovascular grafting”.

Early life
Volodos was born in a small village Kokoshchitsi, near Slonim, Nowogródek Voivodeship (1919–1939), Poland. He was the second of three brothers.

Years of activity

1952-1958 – Medical student at Odesa Medical Institute (currently Odesa National Medical University ), Odesa, Ukraine;

1958-1962 – General surgeon in Hirske, Luhansk Region, Ukraine, then Head of the Department of General Surgery at the Karbonit local hospital in Zolote, Luhansk Region, Ukraine;

1962-1965 – Postgraduate student at the Department of Thoracic Surgery and Anesthesiology, Ukrainian Institute of Postgraduate Medical Education, Kharkiv, Ukraine;

1964-1965 - Head of Ukraine's first Vascular Surgery Department, Kharkiv City Hospital No. 2;

1965-1972 - Head of the Department of Vascular Surgery, Ukrainian Institute for Hemotransfusion and Emergency Surgery (later, the Kharkiv Scientific and Research Institute for General and Emergency Surgery), Kharkiv, Ukraine;

1970 – Assistant at the Department of Thoracoabdominal Surgery, Ukrainian Institute of Postgraduate Medical Education, Kharkiv, Ukraine;

1971 – Ph.D. in medical sciences;

1972-2001 - Head of reorganized Department of Vascular Surgery at the Kharkiv Scientific and Research Institute for General and Emergency Surgery, Kharkiv, Ukraine;

1987 – Doctoral degree in medical sciences;

1992 – Professor at the Department of Cardiology and Functional Diagnostics, Ukrainian Institute for Postgraduate Medical Education, Kharkiv, Ukraine;

1992-2013 - Head of the Kharkiv Center for Cardiovascular Surgery, which Volodos founded in Kharkiv, Ukraine.

Professional achievements

Volodos started his surgical career after graduating in 1958 from the Odesa Medical Institute in Odesa, Ukraine. During 1958–1962, he first worked as a general surgeon in Hirske, Luhansk Region, then as head of the Department of General Surgery at the Karbonit local hospital in Zolote, Luhansk Region. In 1962, Volodos become a postgraduate student at the Department of Thoracic Surgery and Anesthesiology of the Ukrainian Institute of Postgraduate Medical Education in Kharkiv, under the direction of legendary Soviet and Ukrainian surgeon Professor Alexander Shalimov. Under the supervision of Professor Shalimov and following his recommendations, Volodos performed experimental research on roentgenologic contrast examination and surgical treatment of coronary artery disease in dogs. That work was the subject of Volodos’ Ph.D. thesis.

Shalimov himself was an exceptionally talented and experienced surgeon who performed many different types of surgery, including general, oncological, vascular, and cardiovascular operations. In addition, he was a prominent organizer, who established what were at that time new directions in Ukrainian surgery. In 1963, Professor Shalimov established Ukraine's first vascular surgery department at Kharkiv City Hospital No. 2 (renamed after Alexander Shalimov in 2016). And, in 1964, Shalimov appointed Volodos head of the department. In 1965, Shalimov was appointed head of the Ukrainian Institute for Blood Transfusion and Emergency Surgery (later reorganized into the Kharkiv Scientific and Research Institute for General and Emergency Surgery). Volodos followed his mentor and became its head of Vascular Surgery department. In 1972, Shalimov left Kharkiv and moved to Kyiv to establish his new Institute for Surgery and Transplantation (now the Shalimov National Institute for Surgery and Transplantation), and Volodos assumed the role of senior vascular surgeon for the Kharkiv region, as well as Poltava, Sumy and Belgorod. In 1972, Volodos became the first surgeon in the Kharkiv region to perform selective coronary angiography and ventriculography in patients with ischaemic coronary artery disease. Then, in 1974, he was the first to perform an aortocoronary bypass procedure in Kharkiv. 

Having been trained by Professor Shalimov, Volodos based his lifelong approach to clinical practice on Shalimov's two enduring principles:

1. Everything a doctor does should be centered on the needs of the patient.

2. If you do not know of a treatment that will help your patient, invent one.

Volodos was among those rare surgeons who could perform open and endovascular procedures on virtually any segment of the cardiovascular system, including the heart, the aorta and its branches, and the renal, extracranial, intracranial, and pulmonary arteries. Volodos and his department for a long time were among the country leaders in surgical and medical treatment of patients with peripheral arterial diseases (PAD). Throughout his career, at the departments he led, Volodos actively introduced into routine clinical practice many new diagnostic and treatment schemes, and he developed his own, including original diagnostic and surgical devices and instruments in partnership with scientific and industry collaborators.  

In January 1977, Volodos became the first surgeon in the Soviet Union to perform replantation of the arm after its traumatic transhumeral amputation. The case was described in the central press («Известия» от 9 февраля 1977, «Известия» 1977 2, «Правда» 1977) and became the catalyst for the beginning of microsurgery as a surgical specialty in Soviet medicine. Soon after that, new specialised microsurgical centers were founded in different regions of the Soviet Union.

In that same year, Volodos also performed Ukraine's first successful surgical repair of traumatic rupture of thoracic aorta. Soon after that, Volodos initiated several projects to improve the clinical examination and treatment of patients with different diseases of the aorta and its branches. This included making advances in minimally invasive surgery for the treatment of aortic aneurysms. Accordingly, to Volodos, in those scientific pursuits he was strongly influenced by Charles Dotter’s works and professional life. As a result, Volodos and associates developed the world's first stent graft, which was successfully used by him in clinic. That project resulted in the creation of more devices, including the Z-stent, different configurations of self-expanding stent grafts, multiple delivery systems, and endovascular procedures for use in the clinic. Volodos developed the principle of building an endovascular stent graft as combination of a stent as its attachment mechanism and a vascular graft, which had a significant impact on the development of many modern devices. Such devices as valves for transcatheter aortic valve implantation (TAVI); biliary, tracheal, and rectal stent grafts (currently called covered stents); and endovascular stents for peripheral arteries are all built on the same principle.

Volodos was a strong advocate for developing medicine through specialization. In particular, he actively promoted the concept that vascular and endovascular surgery should be developed as an independent specialty in its own right. In accordance with that principle, Volodos founded the Kharkiv Center for Cardiovascular Surgery (KhCCVS) in 1992, which then evolved into an independent organization with its own clinical and scientific divisions. He remained head of the KhCCVS until his retirement in 2013.

Volodos was also a strong advocate of adopting a multidisciplinary approach to the treatment of patients with cardiovascular diseases. He and his colleagues frequently collaborated with cardiologists, neurologists, endocrinologists, and others to ensure that his patients received the best possible advice regarding their care. At the same time, Volodos actively promoted more extensive use of surgical methods in the treatment of these patients.

Before being given the opportunity to join any Western professional societies, Volodos for many years was an active member of such professional organizations as the Association of Cardiovascular Surgeons of Ukraine and the Russian Society of Angiologists and Vascular Surgeons. He used his membership for extensive exchange of practical information with his colleagues.

Throughout his career, Volodos considered himself primarily a surgeon. All results of his scientific and practical research necessarily assumed their further application in the clinic.

Stent graft project

Volodos and members of his team wrote far fewer publications in English than in Russian, especially about their earliest work. Their English-language publications are centered mostly on describing historical aspects of their stent graft project, with relatively few technical details, whereas their most comprehensive material appears in the Russian and Ukrainian literature.  . So, some important details of Volodos’ work remain largely inaccessible to Western readers.

In the early 1980s, Volodos and associates started realization of the project officially, after developing and producing an attachment mechanism for the stent graft in the form of a “radial zigzag-shaped cylindrical spring”, mostly known today as the Z-stent. Volodos named the new combination of the fixing element and industrially produced synthetic vascular graft an “endoprosthesis”, and he called the clinical practice of implanting these devices “remote endoprosthetics”. The self-expanding endoprosthesis was patented by Volodos and associates in 1984 (USSR patent of 22.05.1984).

For the development and production of the original Z-stent, Volodos collaborated closely with different technical scientific and industrial organizations, not only from Kharkiv but also from several other regions of the Soviet Union. Later, a specialized engineering team was established at the Kharkiv Center for Cardiovascular Surgery as a part of scientific group to further develop and improve the devices.

In December 1983, experimental work regarding stent grafts started in the form of animal studies of the new devices in dogs and testing of the first delivery systems on human cadavers. Before that, the original Z-stents were produced and tested on specially developed equipment. The first stents were made of medical stainless steel, in diameters of 0.6 and 0.7 mm. Substantial research and experimental work was done to select wire with the required properties for the stent. Before the stent was used as a part of stent graft, its properties were designed theoretically and calculated mathematically, particularly the radial force required for the safe fixation of the stent graft in human aorta under different conditions of pulsatile flow. For many years thereafter, Volodos and his team continued work on improving different parameters of the stents.

The first-ever human implantation of the fabric-covered Z-stent was performed by Volodos on May 5, 1985, to treat iliac artery stenosis, in combination with elective femorotibial bypass grafting, in a patient with multilevel atherosclerotic lesions of lower-limb arteries, with good clinical results. During 1985 and 1986, Volodos performed 3 similar procedures with good results.

In 1986, Volodos started using bifurcated stent grafts for intraoperative grafting of the abdominal aorta. This shortened the time for which the vessel had to be clamped.

The first-in-the-world aortic stent graft implantation was performed by Volodos on March 24, 1987, to treat a post-traumatic thoracic aortic aneurysm. Over a follow-up period of 18 years, the patient had no complications. The patient died in 2005 because of pathology not related to the stent graft implantation.

Later, in 1989, in Kharkiv, Ukraine, Volodos and his team performed the world's first endovascular aneurysm repair (EVAR) procedure for treating abdominal aortic aneurysm (AAA). It was the first time when the original unibody bifurcated stent graft and innovative delivery system were used. The endovascular procedure was converted to open surgery because of twisting of the unibody bifurcated stent graft's collateral limb. Subsequently, in May 1993, Volodos performed his first successful EVAR of AAA by using a bifurcated stent graft with a new advanced delivery system. Several EVARs for AAA using straight tubular stent grafts were performed by Volodos and his team during the named period.

On 14 June 1991, Volodos performed a hybrid transthoracic operation with antegrade delivery and deployment (through the ascending aorta) of a stent-graft to treat a post-coarctation pseudoaneurysm of the proximal descending thoracic aorta.

On 19 August 1993, Volodos successfully performed the first ever thoracic endovascular aortic repair (TEVAR) in patient with a false aneurysm of thoracic aorta complicated by aortobronchial fistula.

By the early 1990s, he and his associates had accumulated a large clinical experience (of about 100 cases) with stent-graft implantations in the abdominal and thoracic aorta and in other arterial beds. In parallel with clinical application of the original stent grafts, they continued  work on evaluating different parameters of their devices and their hemodynamics; this work included mathematical modeling, advanced in vitro experiments, and further testing of the devices on human cadavers. Volodos and his associates built research and manufacturing facilities at one center, which could be considered one of the best in the world at that time. That allowed in home production of the most advanced stent graft systems, their preclinical testing, and their clinical application.

In 1987, Volodos and colleagues published their comprehensive work, which included detailed description of the principles Volodos' stent graft systems and their components were developed and built on, along with series of real clinical cases.

The latest period of Volodos’ stent graft project has been described only briefly, and only in Russian.

In 1989, he and his colleagues represented their own set for stent grafting at the Exhibition of Achievements of National Economy (EANE) of the USSR (EANE in Moscow) and UkrSSR (EANE in Kyiv). Since that time, Volodos made substantial efforts to produce his endovascular devices as serial products. During the early 2000s, Volodos developed new advanced stent graft systems, including the new Z-stent made of Nitinol, and received the full package of official permissions for their manufacture and clinical application in Ukraine. It was manufactured at a Ukrainian industrial facility. In 2010, the first Ukrainian serial stent graft system was successfully used in clinic by Volodos’ colleagues in Kyiv to treat a patient with AAA. Unfortunately, that period in the history of Ukraine can be described as long-term political instability and serious stagnation of the national economy. Limited domestic production options dampened the ability to produce world class medical devices in the country and restricted advancement into international markets. These factors did not allow the Ukrainian stent graft project to come to fruition.

Many talented scientists, physicians, and engineers to whom Volodos was forever grateful contributed to his stent graft program. However, from its very beginning to the end, Volodos was the undoubted leader. He alone developed the concept of his stent grafts and many of the basic principles of the construction of the delivery systems. Drawing on his extensive personal experience and outstanding practical skills, he could develop protocols for the surgical procedures that had never existed before. He personally planned different stages of the project and took active part in their realization. In many situations, Volodos was able to take full personal responsibility for all decisions made and their consequences.

Personal qualities and traits

Volodos considered himself a doctor first, and he clearly stated that his main mission was to help patients in need. He dedicated his life to that idea. He stood out among his colleagues with his endless curiosity, outstanding capacity for work, sense of purpose, and spirit of innovation. From the first steps to the end of his professional activity, Volodos persistently worked on improving his professional skills. He always stayed current with the available medical literature and considered one of his biggest and most valuable personal treasures the large library that he assembled over his lifetime. He never returned from vacation without new books and other publications. Traveling to different places, Volodos always visited local libraries and bookstores, which he never left without buying a couple of new books. He cultivated among his junior colleagues a love for new knowledge and fostered their professional development. Even after his retirement, Volodos socialized with his colleagues, who wanted to draw on the rich experience he had gained during his professional life. Volodos attended various professional events and meetings, where he enthusiastically shared his experience and expertise.

As a senior and experienced professional, Volodos provided supportive backing to his younger colleagues in solving various difficult and complex clinical cases, as well as in finding answers to challenging personal problems.

Volodos highly appreciated teamwork and was a leader capable of uniting different people to solve challenging, complicated tasks while working together. He deeply and honestly respected his teachers and mentors, from whom he learned a lot.

Volodos appreciated honest and decent people, and he was one himself. He was very grateful to those who helped and supported him in different ways with the realization of his projects. Among his colleagues and patients, Volodos received the utmost respect for his humane attitude toward both patients and coworkers, which he considered an essential part of a doctor's mission. In his colleagues’ eyes, Volodos possessed the best qualities of a true doctor and a human being. For them, for many years, his example will be one to follow.

Awards and honours

In 1976, Volodos was awarded the Order of the Badge of Honour (USSR).

In 1985, was awarded the Medal "Veteran of Labour" (USSR).

In 1989, Volodos and members of his team were awarded the I and II degree Diplomas of Exhibition of Achievements of National Economy (EANE) of the USSR (EANE in Moscow) and UkrSSR (EANE in Kyiv) for developing a new method of treating arterial diseases (stent grafting) and the set of surgical instruments for its implementation.

In 2011, was granted "The ISES Milestone Award". Became the ISES member in 2006.

In 2013, was accepted as Honorary Member of The Edward B. Diethrich Vascular Surgical Society.

In 2014, was nominated as Honorary Member by The German Vascular Society. At the same time, he was awarded the Jörg Vollmar Medal by the Jörg Vollmar Foundation.  

In 2015, was honoured with the International Bakoulev Award «For the first in the World development and clinical use of stent graft for the treatment of thoracic aortic aneurism».

In 2015, was granted the ESVS Honorary Membership.

In 2016, the European Society for Vascular Surgery (ESVS) commissioned a keynote lecture to be delivered at the Society's Annual Scientific Meeting.  In honour of his great achievements, ESVS named the lecture after Professor Nicolai Volodos. The inaugural lecture was delivered by Professor Ross Naylor (Leicester, UK) in Copenhagen in 2016 and he was succeeded by Professor Peter Gloviczki (USA) in Lyon in 2017 [2], by Sumaira MacDonald (USA) in Valencia in 2018 and by Professor Krassi Ivancev (Germany) in Hamburg in 2019 [1], by Dr.Claude Mialhe (France) in 2020, by Dr. B. Mitchell (USA) in Rotterdam in 2021, by Professor Gustavo S. Oderich in Rome in 2022.

References

Soviet thoracic surgeons

Soviet cardiologists

Ukrainian cardiac surgeons

1934 births

2016 deaths